Bruno da Silva Lopes (born 19 August 1986), commonly referred to as Bruno Lopes, is a Brazilian professional footballer who plays as a striker.

Career

Vila Nova (loan)
While on loan to Vila Nova Lopes scored 10 goals for the club to help it avoid relegation in the Serie B.

Albirex Niigata (loan)
On 12 January 2011, Bruno Lopes signed for Japanese J1 club Albirex Niigata, a one-year loan with a buyout clause. He made his debut for Albirex in the 3–0 opening round victory against Avispa Fukuoka, in which he scored the second goal of the game.

Persija Jakarta
On 20 April 2017, Lopes joined the Indonesian club side, Persija Jakarta. He signed one year deal with the option to extend his stay for a further two years at the end of the season.

Kelantan
On 29 December 2017, Lopes signed a one-year contract with Malaysian side Kelantan. Bruno made his league debut for Kelantan in 2–1 defeat to Melaka United on 3 February 2018 and managed to score 1 goal during that match.

He was released by Kelantan in April 2018.

Montedio Yamagata
Montedio Yamagata announced on 22 November 2018, that Lopes would leave the club at the end of the year, when his contract expired.

Career statistics

References

External links
 
 
 

1986 births
Living people
Brazilian footballers
Association football forwards
Association football midfielders
Campeonato Brasileiro Série B players
Campeonato Brasileiro Série C players
Campeonato Brasileiro Série D players
Campeonato Paranaense players
Venezuelan Primera División players
J1 League players
Primeira Liga players
Bruno Lopes
Saudi Professional League players
Liga 1 (Indonesia) players
Malaysia Super League players
J2 League players
América Futebol Clube (MG) players
Joinville Esporte Clube players
A.C.C.D. Mineros de Guayana players
Uberaba Sport Club players
Grêmio Esportivo Anápolis players
Vila Nova Futebol Clube players
Albirex Niigata players
Desportivo Brasil players
G.D. Estoril Praia players
Bruno Lopes
Hajer FC players
Associação Ferroviária de Esportes players
Persija Jakarta players
Kelantan FA players
Montedio Yamagata players
FC Cascavel players
Vitória Futebol Clube (ES) players
Madura United F.C. players
Paraná Clube players
Brazilian expatriate footballers
Brazilian expatriate sportspeople in Venezuela
Expatriate footballers in Venezuela
Brazilian expatriate sportspeople in Japan
Expatriate footballers in Japan
Brazilian expatriate sportspeople in Portugal
Expatriate footballers in Portugal
Brazilian expatriate sportspeople in Thailand
Expatriate footballers in Thailand
Brazilian expatriate sportspeople in Saudi Arabia
Expatriate footballers in Saudi Arabia
Brazilian expatriate sportspeople in Indonesia
Expatriate footballers in Indonesia
Brazilian expatriate sportspeople in Malaysia
Expatriate footballers in Malaysia
Footballers from Curitiba